Ballet of the 20th Century, was a ballet and contemporary dance company in Brussels, Belgium in 1960, by the French/Swiss choreographer Maurice Béjart. For many years it was the official dance company of the Théâtre Royal de la Monnaie.

The company was known for including South and East Asian elements in its performances.

History
Bejart had previously founded a company in Paris, which he named first Les Ballets de l'Étoile, and later Ballet Théâtre de Maurice Bejart. When he moved to Brussels in 1960, he relocated the company and renamed it Ballet du XXme Siècle.  It was eventually dissolved when Bejart moved to Switzerland to form Béjart Ballet in Lausanne in 1987.

Main performers 
Women

 Angèle Albrecht
 Hitomi Asakawa
 Tania Bari
 Tessa Beaumont
 Claire Carrie
 Louba Dobrievich
 Suzanne Farrell
 Maina Gielgud
 Graziella Gillebertus
 Nicole Karys
 Jaleh Kerendi
 Brigitte Kher
 Dolorès Laga
 Beatriz Margenat
 Maguy Marin
 Andrée Marlière
 Menia Martinez
 Shonach Mirk
 Lise Pinet
 Rita Poelvoorde
 Laura Proença
 Michèle Rimbold
 Michèle Seigneuret
 Duška Sifnios
 Mathé Souverbie
 Christine Teyssier
 Carole Trévoux
 Catherine Verneuil

Men

 Rouben Bach
 Alain Baran
 Patrick Belda
 Vittorio Biagi
 Paolo Bortoluzzi
 Serge Campardon
 Antonio Cano
 Germinal Casado
 Pierre Dobrievich
 Jorge Donn
 Niklas Ek
 Michel Gascard
 André Herbet
 Daniel Lambo
 Jörg Lanner
 André Leclair
 Jorge Lefebre
 Yann Le Gac
 Pilippe Lizon
 Daniel Lommel
 Iván Markó
 Claude Mazodier
 Jan Nuyts
 Timur Ratlas
 Gil Roman
 Franco Romano
 Patrick Sarrazin
 Jacques Sausin
 Rachid Tika
 Patrice Touron
 Victor Ullate
 Micha van Hoecke
 Jean Vinclair
 Éric Vu-An
 Gerard Wilk

References

External links
 Béjart: Ballet of the Twentieth Century at the Internet Broadway Database
Information as shown on the French language Wikipedia

Ballet companies in France
Contemporary dance
20th-century ballet
Performing groups established in 1960
Organizations disestablished in 1987
1960 establishments in France
1987 disestablishments in France